Major General Sir Frederick Oscar Warren Loomis   (February 1, 1870 – February 15, 1937) was a Canadian soldier who fought in the First World War.

Military career
He enlisted as a private in the Canadian Militia in 1886 with the 53rd Sherbrooke Battalion of Infantry and was made a Provisional Lieutenant in 1897. He was commissioned a year later and transferred to 5th Regiment, Royal Highlanders of Canada in Montreal in 1903 and was later promoted to Major in 1905.

At the outbreak of war in August 1914 he enlisted for active service at the front and was given command of the 13th Battalion (Royal Highlanders of Canada), CEF. Promoted to rank of Colonel in January 1916, he was given command of a training brigade in England. In May 1916, Loomis was promoted as a Brigadier General and took command of the newly formed 7th Canadian Infantry Brigade. In July of that same year, he was appointed to command of the 2nd Canadian Infantry Brigade and would see the brigade through the battles at the Ypres Salient, Somme, Vimy Ridge,  Arlleux, Hill 70, and  Passchendaele during 1916 and 1917. In 1918 he was engaged in battles at  Amiens and  Arras. In September 1918, Loomis was promoted to Major General and was given command of the 3rd Canadian Division and commanded the division during the last two months of the First World War, leading the division through the Battle of Cambrai and succeeding battles culminating in the capture of Mons on November 11, 1918.

He was knighted by George V in 1919 for his service during the war and retired from the Canada Militia later in May of that year.

Honours and legacy 
On November 11, 2018, the hundredth anniversary of the Armistice with Germany, The Black Watch (Royal Highland Regiment) of Canada, with bagpipes and drums playing, marched through the streets of Mons to the building that was Major-General Frederick Loomis’s headquarters during the First World War. There a ceremony was held for the unveiling of a plaque commemorating this building as the HQ of the 3rd CDN Division.

He is portrayed in a painting in the Canadian Senate Chamber leading the  Royal Highlanders of Canada (Canadian Expeditionary Force) into Saint-Nazaire in 1915.

Mount Loomis on the Alberta–British Columbia border is named after him.

References

See also 
List of Bishop's College School alumni

Canadian Knights Commander of the Order of the Bath
Canadian Companions of the Order of St Michael and St George
Canadian Companions of the Distinguished Service Order
1870 births
1937 deaths
Officiers of the Légion d'honneur
Canadian military personnel from Quebec
Bishop's College School alumni
Businesspeople from Sherbrooke
Canadian generals of World War I
Canadian Expeditionary Force officers
Canadian Militia officers

Sherbrooke Hussars
Black Watch (Royal Highland Regiment) of Canada officers